Cesar Alvarado (born 18 December 1978) is a Mexican former professional football midfielder who played for the Tampa Bay Mutiny in Major League Soccer.

Alvarado graduated from the American Global Soccer School.  He attended the Cal Poly Pomona University and played for the Valley Golden Eagles of the USISL.  On February 1, 1998, the Los Angeles Galaxy selected Alvarado in the second round (eighteenth overall) of the 1998 MLS Supplemental Draft.  The Galaxy released him in the pre-season.  That season, he played three games with MLS Pro 40.  On February 25, 1998, the Tampa Bay Mutiny signed Alvarado.
  
Cesar, concluded his education in 2007 with a Major in Mechanical Engineering.

References

External links
 1999 Tampa Bay Mutiny roster
 

Living people
1978 births
American soccer players
American sportspeople of Mexican descent
Major League Soccer players
Tampa Bay Mutiny players
MLS Pro-40 players
USL Second Division players
A-League (1995–2004) players
LA Galaxy draft picks
Association football midfielders